Parliamentary elections were held in the Mongolian People's Republic in 1924 to elect the first Great Khural.

Background
Following the Mongolian Revolution of 1921, the Mongolian People's Party took control of the new Mongolian People's Republic. A 20-member commission drafted a new constitution, which was modelled on the 1918 constitution of the Russian Soviet Federative Socialist Republic; the commission was chaired by Prime Minister Balingiin Tserendorj and supervised by Turar Ryskulov from Comintern. A 90-member Great Khural was to be elected to approve the new constitution.

Results
Despite representatives of the Mongolian People's Party and the Youth League instructing people to vote for commoners, several princes were elected, including Dugarjav of Ikh Dulaan uul and Tseren-ochir of Tüsheet Khan. The princes were subsequently disqualified and re-runs held, although six princes subsequently became members. Nine of the elected members were lamas and seven were illiterate. All 90 elected candidates were men.

Aftermath
The newly elected Great Khural convened on 8 November, although only 77 of the 90 members attended. Of those in attendance, 64 were members of the Mongolian People's Party or the Youth League. Navaandorjiin Jadamba was elected Chairman. The constitution was approved in a unanimous vote on 26 November.

References

Mongolia
Elections in Mongolia
1924 in Mongolia